= Promoter based genetic algorithm =

Genetic algorithm for neuroevolution

The promoter based genetic algorithm (PBGA) is a genetic algorithm for neuroevolution developed by F. Bellas and R.J. Duro in the Integrated Group for Engineering Research (GII) at the University of Coruña, in Spain. It evolves variable size feedforward artificial neural networks (ANN) that are encoded into sequences of genes for constructing a basic ANN unit. Each of these blocks is preceded by a gene promoter acting as an on/off switch that determines if that particular unit will be expressed or not.

== PBGA basics ==
The basic unit in the PBGA is a neuron with all of its inbound connections as represented in the following figure:

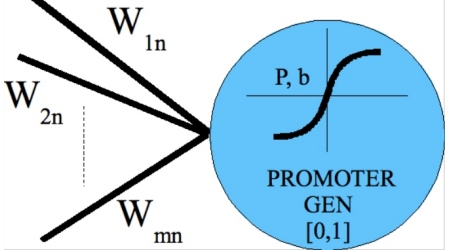

The genotype of a basic unit is a set of real valued weights followed by the parameters of the neuron and proceeded by an integer valued field that determines the promoter gene value and, consequently, the expression of the unit. By concatenating units of this type we can construct the whole network.

With this encoding it is imposed that the information that is not expressed is still carried by the genotype in evolution but it is shielded from direct selective pressure, maintaining this way the diversity in the population, which has been a design premise for this algorithm. Therefore, a clear difference is established between the search space and the solution space, permitting information learned and encoded into the genotypic representation to be preserved by disabling promoter genes.

== Results ==
The PBGA was originally presented within the field of autonomous robotics, in particular in the real time learning of environment models of the robot.

It has been used inside the Multilevel Darwinist Brain (MDB) cognitive mechanism developed in the GII for real robots on-line learning. In another paper it is shown how the application of the PBGA together with an external memory that stores the successful obtained world models, is an optimal strategy for adaptation in dynamic environments.

Recently, the PBGA has provided results that outperform other neuroevolutionary algorithms in non-stationary problems, where the fitness function varies in time.
